The huge moth family Noctuidae contains the following genera:

A B C D E F G H I J K L M N O P Q R S T U V W X Y Z

Naarda
Nabartha
Naboa
Nacerasa
Nacna
Nacopa
Naenia
Naesia
Nagadeba
Naganoella
Nagara
Nagia
Nahara
Naharra
Namangana
Namanganum
Nanamonodes
Nanthilda
Naranga
Narangodes
Narcaea
Narcotica
Narthecophora
Narulla
Nasaya
Nazuda
Neachrostia
Neathyrma
Nebrissa
Nechesia
Nedra
Nedroma
Neeugoa
Nekrasovia
Neleucania
Neoborolia
Neocalymnia
Neocerynea
Neochera
Neochrostis
Neocleptria
Neocodia
Neocomia
Neocucullia
Neoerastria
Neogabara
Neogalea
Neogrotella
Neoherminia
Neolaphygma
Neolita
Neomanobia
Neomilichia
Neomonodes
Neopalthis
Neopangrapta
Neophaenis
Neophaeus
Neopistria
Neoplusia
Neoptista
Neoptodes
Neosema
Neostichtis
Neostrotia
Neotarache
Neothripa
Neotuerta
Nepaloridia
Neperigea
Nephelemorpha
Nephelina
Nephelistis
Nephelodes
Nerastria
Nereisana
Nesaegocera
Nesamiptis
Netrocerocora
Neumichtis
Neumoegenia
Neuquenioa
Neuranethes
Neurois
Neuronia
Neustrotia
Neviasca
Nezonycta
Niaboma
Niaccaba
Niaccabana
Nicetas
Nicevillea
Nigetia
Nigramma
Nigryigoga
Niguza
Nikara
Nimasia
Niphonyx
Niphosticta
Nipista
Nocloa
Noctasota
Nocthadena
Noctua
Noctubourgognea
Noctuites
Noctulizeria
Nodaria
Nolaphana
Nolasena
Nolaseniola
Nolasodes
Nonagria
Noropsis
Noshimea
Notioplusia
Notocyma
Nubiothis
Nudifrons
Numeniastes
Nychioptera
Nyctennomos
Nycterophaeta
Nyctipolia
Nyctobrya
Nyctodryas
Nyctycia
Nyctyciomorpha
Nyeanella
Nymbis
Nyodes
Nyssocnemis
Nytorga

References 

 Natural History Museum Lepidoptera genus database

 
Noctuid genera N